In England and Wales, watch committees were the local government bodies which oversaw policing from 1835 until, in some areas, 1968.

Establishment 

The Municipal Corporations Act 1835 required each borough to establish a "watch committee" and to appoint constables to 'preserve the peace'.

Disestablishment 

From 1889 counties switched to using "standing joint committees" which also had magistrates among their members. For police forces working within a single borough, watch committees were retained.

The Police Act 1964 replaced both sets of bodies with police authorities, comprising two-thirds elected members of county or borough councils, and one-third magistrates.

References 

 Municipal Corporations Act 1835
 Police Act 1964

Law enforcement in England and Wales
Local government in England
Local government in Wales